Belcourt is a municipality in northwestern Quebec, Canada, in the La Vallée-de-l'Or Regional County Municipality.

History
Following the construction of the National Transcontinental Railway, the area opened up for colonization. The new settlement was originally called Café or Coffee but renamed to Goulet, after the first permanent settler who arrived in 1915. In 1918, it was incorporated as the United Township Municipality of Carpentier-et-Courville. Since there already was a Goulet Post Office in Bellechasse County, the place was officially renamed to Belcourt in 1958, in honour of Napoléon-Antoine Belcourt (1860-1932).

Demographics
Population trend:
 Population in 2011: 239 (2006 to 2011 population change: -6.6%)
 Population in 2006: 256
 Population in 2001: 272
 Population in 1996: 285
 Population in 1991: 292

Private dwellings occupied by usual residents: 112 (total dwellings: 123)

Mother tongue:
 English as first language: 0%
 French as first language: 100%
 English and French as first language: 0%
 Other as first language: 0%

References

Municipalities in Quebec
Incorporated places in Abitibi-Témiscamingue